Baron  was a Japanese statesman. He served as Minister of Education (1914), Home Minister (1915), Imperial Household Minister (1925), and President of the Privy Council (1934-1936).

Biography
Ichiki was born is what is now Kakegawa, Shizuoka Prefecture, where his father, an entrepreneur and politician, was a student of the philosophies of Ninomiya Sontoku.

Ichiki graduated from the Tokyo Imperial University in 1887 and entered the Home Ministry in the same year. In 1890, he was sent to Germany for further studies, returning to Japan in 1894. On his return, he became a professor of law at Tokyo Imperial University, and in 1906 became a member of the prestigious Imperial Academy. From September 1907 through August 1918, he was appointed to one of the seats in the House of Peers in the Diet of Japan which were reserved for the Imperial Academy.

From 1902 to 1906, Ichiki also served as Director-General of the Cabinet Legislation Bureau. He served again in the same capacity from 1912 to 1913. He first joined the Cabinet under the 2nd Ōkum administration in 1914 as Minister of Education. The following year, he was appointed Home Minister. In 1925, Ichiki became Imperial Household Minister.

Ichiki was awarded the Order of the Sacred Treasure (1st class) in December 1915, and the Order of the Rising Sun (1st class) in July 1916. He attained the Order of the Paulownia Flowers in December 1928, and was ennobled with the title of danshaku (baron) in the kazoku peerage system in 1933.

From 1934 to 1936, Ichiki was president of the Privy Council. This coincided with a period of considerable controversy over the role of the monarchy in Japan, especially centered around the works of Tatsukichi Minobe, a professor of constitutional law at Tokyo Imperial University and one of Ichiki’s former students.

After the assassination of Lord Keeper of the Privy Seal Saitō Makoto in the February 26 Incident in 1936, he acted as Lord Keeper for one day on 6 March 1936, in order to have the successor formally appointed. He was effectively forced into retirement by the new Lord Keeper, Kiichirō Hiranuma, who was his political nemesis. He retired to his native Kakegawa, and on his death was awarded the Grand Cordon of the Supreme Order of the Chrysanthemum. His grave is at the Yanaka Cemetery in Tokyo.

References
 Conners, Leslie. The Emperor's Adviser: Saionji Kinmochi and Pre-War Japanese Politics. Routledge Kegan & Paul. 
 Miller, Frank Owen. (1965). Minobe Tatsukichi: Interpreter Of Constitutionalism in Japan. Berkeley: University of California Press. OCLC 562979985
 Ozaki, Yukio. (2001).  The Autobiography of Ozaki Yukio: The Struggle for Constitutional Government in Japan (translated by Fujiko Hara). Princeton: Princeton University Press. 

 

1867 births
1944 deaths
Politicians from Shizuoka Prefecture
People from Kakegawa, Shizuoka
University of Tokyo alumni
Members of the House of Peers (Japan)
Government ministers of Japan
Education ministers of Japan
Ministers of Home Affairs of Japan
Kazoku
Recipients of the Order of the Paulownia Flowers
Grand Cordons of the Order of the Rising Sun
Recipients of the Order of the Sacred Treasure, 1st class